Gail Scott may refer to:

Gail Scott (journalist), a Canadian television news correspondent and anchor
Gail Scott (writer), a Canadian novelist and poet